Harlin is a surname. Notable people with the surname include:

Donald J. Harlin (1935–2015), American Air Force major general 
Renny Harlin (born 1959), Finnish film director, producer, and screenwriter
Robert H. Harlin (1882/1883–1962), American politician